Ruban Nielson (born 20 February 1980) is a New Zealand musician, singer and songwriter, best known for being the frontman of the psychedelic rock band Unknown Mortal Orchestra. One of the most acclaimed New Zealand musicians of his generation, he has won two Aotearoa music awards and an APRA Silver Scroll, over the course of his band's five studio albums and one extended play. 

Born in Darwin, Australia, to a Hawaiian mother and a Maori father, Nielson was raised in Orewa, Auckland in a working-class musical family. After support from his teachers at Orewa College, Nielson attended Elam, Auckland's most eminent Fine Arts school. He graduated in 2002 as a recipient Sir James Wallace art award, one year after forming The Mint Chicks with Paul Roper, Michael Logie and his brother Kody Nielson. The four members met at Orewa College, although the band started moving between Portland, Oregon, where Nielson would later be based, and Auckland. The band, known for its nihilistic ideology, disorderly behaviour, neo-punk elements and groundbreaking discography, broke up following Ruban's departure. Nielson subsequently attempted to quit music, but he found himself increasingly passionate about it, and formed a more experimental and psychedelic band, Unknown Mortal Orchestra, with musician Jake Portrait. His brother Kody also has performed drums on almost every Unknown Mortal Orchestra album. 

Nielson achieved critical acclaim and success worldwide with the band's self-titled debut album Unknown Mortal Orchestra, released in 2011. The album won the Taite music prize the following year. Further success came with II, released in 2013, and the group began selling out shows across North America. Nielson's global breakthrough album is considered to be the multi-award winning third effort Multi-Love, which made it high onto lists by The Guardian, NME and Consequence of Sound for the best albums of 2015. Singles "Multi-Love" and "Can't Keep Checking My Phone" were both A-listed at BBC's 6 Music. The album was considered to be, by far, Nielson's most personal; thematically, it was centered on a year-long polyamorous relationship he and his wife had with a younger woman from Tokyo, and the feelings of experimentation and euphoria, and the romantic turmoil of its end after the woman's visa expired. Two more acclaimed albums, Sex + Food, and the instrumental IC-01 Hanoi, followed in 2018. 

Nielson continues to live in the United States with his family. He has become a symbol of the rejuvenation of psychedelic music in Australasia, alongside the likes of Tame Impala, Connan Mockasin, LEISURE and Pond. NME has summed up Nielson as a master in creating "works of warm, fuzzy beauty." Nielson remains humble and jocular, saying in response to being described as a musical provocateur; "No, I don't purposefully go out to try and do that......but it is really fun."

Biography

Early life
Nielson was born in Darwin, Australia on 20 February 1980. His mother is an American hula dancer from Oahu, Hawaii and his father is New Zealand Maori brass player and Elam School of Fine Arts alumni, Chris Nielson, who toured with lounge singer John Knowles in the 1970s and has played in New Zealand bands such as Katchafire. With his mother being a Native Hawaiian woman (Kānaka Maoli), there was an instant cultural connection with Nielson's Māori father; the two ethnic groups are closely connected, and the ancestral Māori homeland is known as Hawaiki. The two met on tour in Los Angeles, and later had another son, Kody (born 9 May 1982), who later became a musician alongside Nielson. The transpacific couple moved to Auckland when Nielson was young, where he grew up and regards as his home. Chris Nielson collaborated with his sons on Unknown Mortal Orchestra's 2018 album, IC-01 Hanoi, playing the flügelhorn and saxophone.

Nielson had a difficult childhood, growing up in poverty in Orewa. Growing up half Māori and half Hawaiian in a country with significant institutional bias and racism towards Polynesians, he stated he and his brother had “to be the kid a shop owner will follow around...It’s like you’re walking into every situation at a negative 10, and you’ve got to work really hard to get to zero.” Home life was difficult, due to his father's chronic alcoholism and heroin addiction, a lack of money and the fallout from his parents' separation. As a teenager, Nielson developed insomnia, and was unable to sleep at night; this affected his academic performance. Despite his addictions, his father cared for his children, and felt guilty about his illnesses and choices affecting them. As he weaned himself off heroin and alcohol, he made amends with his son by buying him his first guitar and getting recommendations from his Orewa College teachers to get him into Elam School of Fine Arts, New Zealand's most prestigious art school. He graduated in 2002 with distinction, winning a Sir James Wallace art award. His father influenced him them and continues to do so, despite being a difficult person to live with due to his struggles with drug addiction . When listed in the University of Auckland's 40 under 40 list in 2020, Nielson said of his father and Elam:

"His stories of Elam when I was a kid really stoked my desire to be there. He helped me get into Elam and negotiate what was originally a kind of ‘probational situation’ with my acceptance. Being at Elam really fulfilled a childhood dream and people like Nuala Gregory, Peter Shand, Jim Speers, Leigh Martin, Judy Millar and Denys Watkins as well as many others all had a huge impact on the way I see the world and creativity.”

He maintains an interest in the visual arts, and says that if he had not entered music as a profession he would have become a visual artist.

The Mint Chicks (2001–10)
The Nielson brothers, Ruban and Kody, enjoyed making music together from a young age, despite their sibling rivalry and difficult home life. Ruban found it as a way to cope with his worsening insomnia, while the younger Kody enjoyed daredevil stunts and being a loud and anarchic frontman. The brothers formed the band in high school in 2001, alongside two friends, Michael Logie and Paul Roper. They began by playing punk house parties and low profile shows before being discovered by the internationally acclaimed New Zealand independent record label Flying Nun Records. The Mint Chicks, a neo-punk and "shit-gaze" band, were famed for their noisy, rowdy shows (with Kody Nielson often hanging himself upside down from the stage).They released two EPs and three albums under the Flying Nun Records banner: Octagon, Octagon, Octagon EP (2003), Anti-Tiger EP (2004), Fuck the Golden Youth (2005), Crazy? Yes! Dumb? No! (2006) and Screens (2009), as well as one EP on a minor label, Bad Buzz (2010). All were produced and recorded by the band's core members Ruban and Kody Nielson, with the exception of Crazy? Yes! Dumb? No! which was produced by the Nielson brothers and their father Chris Nielson at two different home studios.

All four original band members met at Orewa College in Orewa, New Zealand, although the band starting moving between Portland, Oregon and Auckland, as the Nielson brothers have dual citizenship in New Zealand and the U.S.

In 2006, the band played support for the Yeah Yeah Yeahs. The volume of the show was reportedly so loud that part of the St James theater complex fell down, injuring two concert goers. They have also played support slots for The White Stripes, Death From Above 1979, TV on the Radio, The Blood Brothers, The Black Lips, and The Bronx. They were also part of the New Zealand line-up for Big Day Out 2004, 2005, 2007 and 2009. In 2005, it was notable that Kody Nielson wielded a chainsaw on stage and destroyed a corporate sponsor's overly prominent sign with it. 

At the 2007 New Zealand Music Awards the band won five Tui awards including best rock group, best album, best rock album as well as winning best album cover and best music video for the single "Crazy? Yes! Dumb? No!".

On 24 October 2007, it was announced on the band's website that their bassist Michael Logie would leave the band when they relocated to Portland. The group continued as a trio, with Logie relocating to London, England. The band played a free show in Portland on 29 June 2008, in which they played their then-upcoming third album from beginning to end live. The band later supported Shihad on the July 2008 Beautiful Machine Tour and tested their new songs in front of a home audience. As a result of their bass player having left the band, the Mint Chicks weren't able to play hits from earlier songs, angering some fans. To counter this Shihad's bass player, Karl Kippenberger, filled in for several more popular songs.

On 25 December 2008, The Mint Chicks released the Mintunes EP consisting of "8-bit versions" of both previously released songs and tracks from the upcoming album. The band also released an iTunes-only single during 2008, "Life Will Get Better Some Day", a teaser for the album "Screens", which was released in New Zealand on 16 March 2009 after having been recorded sporadically over the preceding two years.

In October 2009 the Mint Chicks performed a rendition of Ray Columbus and the Invaders' classic hit She's a Mod at the New Zealand Music awards as a four-piece band, later released as a standalone single. Shortly afterwards on 16 October 2009, it was announced Michael Logie would be rejoining the band in a post on the band's Twitter. The band joined with New Zealand music website MusicHy.pe to promote their next record, the Bad Buzz EP, released in February 2010.

Shortly after the release of the EP, the band played their final show on 12 March 2010. The show, originally a fundraiser for MusicHy.pe, ended in chaos after Kody Nielson destroyed the two drumkits and equipment, imploring the crowd to 'start your own fucking band'.

Unknown Mortal Orchestra

Inception and Unknown Mortal Orchestra (2010–2012)
Nielson left The Mint Chicks in the beginning of 2010, citing a loss of interest in the group's music. Following an incident during one of the band's live performances and Nielson's subsequent departure, The Mint Chicks broke up. Nielson had already returned to Portland, Oregon, where he began working at a film production company as an illustrator. He quickly found himself wanting to write and record music again and began searching for "psychedelic records with lost tunes" for inspiration. Nielson had become very specific about what type of record he wanted to find for inspiration and, with that specificity, began making that record himself instead. Once he had finished writing and recording the first song, Nielson uploaded it anonymously on May 17, 2010 onto Bandcamp under the name "Ffunny Ffrends". Within a day, the song had received significant coverage from independent music blogs such as Pitchfork.

Nielson maintained the band's anonymity as he was not sure what he wanted the band to be and did not want to "face up to Mint Chicks fans and to people who were looking forward to a new Mint Chicks record." Nielson eventually claimed the track under the band name Unknown Mortal Orchestra.

The band's debut self-titled album was released June 21, 2011 on Fat Possum Records. The album quickly received critical acclaim. Pitchfork gave the album an 8.1, describing that with "an expert use of space rare for such a lo-fi record, UMO manages a unique immersive and psychedelic quality without relying on the usual array of bong-ripping effects."

In the spring of 2012, the band won the Taite Music Prize for the album. Although the nominated Unknown Mortal Orchestra did not win Best Alternative Album, Nielson took home the title of Best Male Artist at the 47th annual Vodafone New Zealand Music Awards.

II (2012–2013)
In September 2012, Unknown Mortal Orchestra announced that they had signed to Jagjaguwar and were working on their second full-length album. Unknown Mortal Orchestra's second album, II, was released on February 5, 2013. The first single from the album, entitled "Swim and Sleep (Like a Shark)", was first available as a 7" on their tour with Grizzly Bear.

II has received widespread critical acclaim. In November 2013 it won Best Alternative Album at the New Zealand Music Awards. II was nominated for the Taite Music Prize 2014, an annual music prize awarded for the best album from New Zealand. Clash Music gave the album a 9 out of 10, saying "from opener 'From The Sun', which recalls George Harrison-psychedelia, to the tender Family Stone shuffle of the closing of 'Secret Xtians', 'II' displays both a glowing warmth in its production and a deft use of space that illuminate Nielson's superbly crafted compositions." Paste Magazine called the album "a modern, beat-heavy take on '60s psych, with plenty of hooks and fuzz to get you hooked and feeling fuzzy." NME praised Ruban's ability to turn his songs into "works of warm, fuzzy beauty." 

During the early months of 2012, Unknown Mortal Orchestra capitalized on the success of II and embarked on a world tour. The tour started off with shows in Australia, and hometown shows in New Zealand, followed by several stops in Europe. The band then toured extensively throughout North America with opener Foxygen. In March 2013, Unknown Mortal Orchestra was named one of Fuse TV's 30 must-see artists at SXSW. Unknown Mortal Orchestra consistently sold out shows in both the UK/Europe and in North America, and as a result of their success on the road they announced in early April that they would extend their tour through the end of 2013. That summer the band performed at a number of major European festivals, including Roskilde Festival, Pukkelpop and Lowlands.

On February 25, 2013, Unknown Mortal Orchestra made their American television debut, performing "So Good At Being In Trouble" on Late Night with Jimmy Fallon.

On October 29, 2013, the band released an EP titled Blue Record. It included three acoustic versions of songs taken from their previous album.

Multi-Love (2015)

On February 5, 2015, the band announced their third studio album, Multi-Love. Soon after, they released the title track as the first single, which was designated "Best New Track" by Pitchfork. Multi-Love was released on 26 May 2015, to universal critical acclaim. Rolling Stone commented that "Multi-Love sees Nielson coloring outside the lines for a vibrant vision of connection"  and Pitchfork praised Nielson's ear for how something should sound and referred to the album as his "most accomplished". Singles "Multi-Love" and "Can't Keep Checking My Phone" were both A-listed at BBC's 6 Music. Pitchfork wrote that "[Multi Love] teems with lush synths and futurist textures, hallucinogenic funk and R&B", and was also influenced by Nielson's nascent parenthood (which also influenced his first and second albums with Unknown Mortal Orchestra).

The album was considered to be, by far, Nielson's most personal; thematically, it was centered on a polyamorous relationship he and his wife Jenny had with a Japanese woman, and the feelings of loss when the woman's visa expired and the relationship ended. Speaking with Pitchfork, he said that despite his reservations regarding polyamory at the relationship's onset, that “I feel like I’m gonna spend the rest of my life trying to live [the relationship] down. It was such a beautiful time.”. Nielson recalled treated the relationship as if it was an entirely nascent concept, and "stumbled into it blindly". He met the woman in question after venturing into a Tokyo club when touring in February 2013. Nielson recalls an instant infatuation with the woman, and reciprocated affection on her part; the pair introduced each other at the club and decided to keep in touch. Later that year, the woman came to see UMO perform in Melbourne, and the pair continued to communicate via letter. After introducing the young woman to his wife, she also took an interest in the young woman, and the three began living together in Portland, alongside the Nielson's young children, Moe and Iris.

Following the release, UMO embarked on a tour through the UK, Europe, the US and Canada, with many sold out dates. Touring continued in Europe through that November, before heading to Australia and New Zealand for a string of headline shows in December. On August 12, UMO performed Multi-Love on Late Night with Seth Meyers. On August 25 they performed "Can't Keep Checking My Phone" on Conan. On February 16, 2016 the band performed on Last Call with Carson Daly. "Can't Keep Checking My Phone" also appears in the association football video game FIFA 16.

Sex + Food (2018)The first of Unknown Mortal Orchestra's two albums released in 2018, Sex + Food, was made available in the April of that year. The song's lead single, American Guilt, concerns the feelings of guilt and remorse that came with Nielson's adopted American identity. "Hunnybee", the second single, proved popular, and has received over 33 million views on YouTube as of 4 February 2021.

While recording Sex + Food in Mexico City, Nielson was caught out in the 2017 Puebla Earthquake. In the destruction and chaos that pursued, he spent the night in a local park with his band members. Despite this, he recalls with fondness that they were struggling to think of the right lyric for a song when the earthquake hit and "then, when we were in the park trying to crash out, somebody shouted, 'Viva la Mexico!' … I was like, ‘That’s the missing line!’”. The album was also recorded in Reykjavík, Seoul, Auckland and Hanoi, alongside their fifth album IC-01 Hanoi, which grew as a secondary instrumental project. IC-01 Hanoi (2018)

IC-01 Hanoi, a more complex, instrumental album, followed Sex + Food in 2018. Featuring the Nielson's father, recorded in the same places as their previous album (but especially Hanoi), and influenced by the works of Miles Davis, the album departed from the band's "alt-pop aesthetic". Reviewing the album for Pitchfork, Andy Beta felt that "Ruban Nielson throws off his habitually weighty themes and digs into a refreshingly raw, heady session of psychedelic rock", also saying that the album "presents a visceral, smoky, casual session that cooks together fairly tumultuous moods over the course of its concise runtime". Sungenre.com wrote of the band's collaboration with their father and Vietnamese musicians: "Featuring Vietnamese local Minh Nguyen on Sáo Trúc (flute) and Đàn Môi (jaw harp) along with the veiled talisman of the psych-funk aficionados in that of Ruban Nielson’s father, Chris (saxophone, trumpet, keys), IC-01 Hanoi represents so much more than a haphazard collection of B-sides. Rather, the band harnesses their knack for potent grooves and a coloured sound with the musicianship required to create a concept album conveying a tale devoid of lyrical constraints."

Personal life
Nielson is married to Jenny Nielson, with whom he was previously in a polyamorous relationship with alongside another woman; this courtship was the main inspiration for Multi-Love. He met Jenny during his time at the Elam School of Fine Arts, and the couple moved in together within a few months of their first date. They have two children, Moe and Iris. The family continued to live in Portland, Oregon, and Nielson, despite being a New Zealander, has said living in the country has added to a feeling of American identity. Nielson later moved with his family to Palm Springs, California. During the COVID-19 pandemic, Ruban began dividing his time between Palm Springs and Hilo, Hawaii, to be close to his mother and uncles.

Discography
with Unknown Mortal Orchestra
Unknown Mortal Orchestra (2011)
II (2013)
Multi-Love (2015)
Sex & Food (2018)
IC-01 Hanoi (2018)
V (2023)

with The Mint Chicks
Fuck the Golden Youth (2005)
Crazy? Yes! Dumb? No! (2006)
Screens (2009)

References

External links
 Unknown Mortal Orchestra official website

1980 births
Living people
American rock musicians
Musicians from Portland, Oregon
New Zealand emigrants to the United States
New Zealand rock musicians
People educated at Orewa College
People from Auckland
Polyamorous people